Hacienda Nápoles Airstrip  is an airstrip on Hacienda Nápoles, a large estate in the Antioquia Department of Colombia.

Hacienda Nápoles is the former estate of drug lord Pablo Escobar, confiscated after his death and turned into a theme park. There is also a new maximum security prison on the estate.

See also

Transport in Colombia
List of airports in Colombia

References

External links 
Doradal prison - YouTube (Spanish)
Airstrip parking apron - Vice.com

Airports in Colombia
Antioquia Department